Oostakker, formerly spelled Oostacker, is one of the smaller former municipalities which were merged into Ghent (from which it is only two miles), the capital of the Belgian province of East Flanders. The hamlet is mainly known for the Shrine of Oostakker, a Roman Catholic shrine of the Virgin Mary.
Residents of Oostakker are called Oostakkezen.

Shrine of Oostakker

The miraculous shrine of the Blessed Virgin is a place of pilgrimage from Belgium, the Netherlands and Northern France.  It is a comparatively recent, dating from 1873 dating from a statue in a grotto built by the local gentry family. It was first opened to the local peasants on Sundays, but comparatively quickly it became very popular with a large Gothic church starting to be built in 1877.  The shrine was entrusted to the Jesuits.

Gallery

References

Sources

External links

Shrines to the Virgin Mary
Sub-municipalities of Ghent
Populated places in East Flanders